Scinax garbei is a species of frog in the family Hylidae.
It is found in Bolivia, Brazil, Colombia, Ecuador, Peru, Venezuela, and possibly Guyana.
Its natural habitats are subtropical or tropical moist lowland forests, subtropical or tropical swamps, rivers, intermittent freshwater marshes, plantations, rural gardens, heavily degraded former forest, and ponds.

References

garbei
Amphibians of Bolivia
Amphibians of Brazil
Amphibians of Colombia
Amphibians of Ecuador
Amphibians of Peru
Amphibians of Venezuela
Amphibians described in 1926
Taxa named by Alípio de Miranda-Ribeiro
Taxonomy articles created by Polbot